The 1953 California Golden Bears football team was an American football team that represented the University of California, Berkeley during the 1953 college football season. Under head coach Pappy Waldorf, the team compiled an overall record of 4–4–2 and 2–2–2 in conference.

The 1953 season is partially associated with a recruiting scandal involving star freshman quarterback Ronnie Knox. In order to have Knox enroll at the university, the California football booster club promised him that Knox's step father to be hired as a scout, his high school coach would be hired as an assistant coach, and that Knox himself would be given a job writing for a local newspaper and also be paid $500 per year by the booster club. Knox enrolled at Cal but California's administration found out and made sure that the benefits would not be provided. After one year at Cal, Knox transferred to University of California, Los Angeles (UCLA).

Schedule

References

California
California Golden Bears football seasons
California Golden Bears football